Albert Ely Ives (July 10, 1898 – March 11, 1966) was an American architect.  He partnered in Ives and Hogan, based in Honolulu, Hawaii.

At least two of Ives's works are listed on the National Register of Historic Places.

Works include (with attribution):
 Gibraltar, 250 Pennsylvania Avenue Wilmington, Delaware (Ives, Albert Ely; Coffin, Marian Cruger), NRHP-listed
 Kaneohe Ranch Building, Castle Junction, Kailua, Hawaii (Ives, Albert Ely), NRHP-listed
 Plantation Estate, Oahu, Hawaii, built 1948 (Ives and Hogan)

References

1898 births
1966 deaths
20th-century American architects
20th-century American male artists 
 Architects from Hawaii
Architects from New York (state)
Artists from Honolulu
People from Newburgh, New York
Place of death missing